Liu Haiping (born June 3, 1988 in Shouguang, Shandong) is a Chinese female canoeist. She competed at the 2012 London Olympics and 2016 Rio Olympics in the k-4 500 m event.

References

External links
 
 
 

1988 births
Living people
People from Weifang
People from Binzhou
Canoeists from Shandong
Chinese female canoeists
Olympic canoeists of China
Canoeists at the 2012 Summer Olympics
Canoeists at the 2016 Summer Olympics
Asian Games medalists in canoeing
Canoeists at the 2014 Asian Games
Medalists at the 2014 Asian Games
Asian Games gold medalists for China